= Distinguished Flying Cross =

The Distinguished Flying Cross may refer to:

- Distinguished Flying Cross (United Kingdom), including Commonwealth countries
- Distinguished Flying Cross (United States)
